Head of NASA and the 2 Amish Boys is the eleventh studio album by Israeli psytrance duo Infected Mushroom. It was released on 12 December 2018, and is the duo's first album on Canada-based electronic record label Monstercat.

Tour
In January 2019, Infected Mushroom announced a tour promoting the album, called the "Head of NASA Tour". The tour began on 21 February 2019.

Track listing

Charts

Notes

References 

2018 albums
Infected Mushroom albums
Monstercat albums